Darren Tate (born 22 October 1972, in London) is a British record producer, film composer and club DJ.

Biography
As a classically trained musician, Tate has worked with international artists and songwriters with whom he collaborates regularly. He has also worked in the areas of television, film and musical theatre.

Appearing in various television advertisements during his childhood, he attended boarding school for ten years. As he got older, he was trained in several classical musical instruments, studied Music at Leeds University and enjoyed success in television, film and musical theatre.

In a DMC magazine interview of March 2007, Tate stated that his favourite record was "Unfinished Sympathy" by Massive Attack. In the same interview, it was revealed that three of his biggest influences in his life were Stevie Wonder, John Williams and Brian Eno. Tate has a son who was born in February 2006.

Career
Like many of his fellow DJs, Tate has used a large number of pseudonyms. His first project was a joint effort with Judge Jules in 2000. Together with Jules's wife, Amanda O'Riordan, they named themselves Angelic. Later the same year, he cut a few tracks under the name Orion. September 2002 saw the return of Tate under the name Jurgen Vries. Since then, he has used the name DT8 and most recently was part of DT8 Project. His most successful track in terms of chart presence came with "The Opera Song", which featured Charlotte Church, credited on the sleeve as CMC. Several compilations of dance tunes by major record labels have been mixed by Tate and reached the charts. Tate's first album (released under his own name) was issued in 2006 and titled Horizons 01. The first official DT8 Project album, Perfect World, was released on 1 October 2007. It was a double album, the second containing remixes from other producers.

Tate is also known as a DJ. As well as headlining many events and touring, he hosts the monthly 'Mondo Sessions' (with co-host Dale Corderoy) which is syndicated across an international radio station network (including Ministry of Sound Radio, DI.FM, ETN, Rise FM, Fresh FM, KIK FM and others). In addition, he has performed mixing duties on albums such as Beyond Euphoria (MOS), Trance Republic (with John Askew and Agnelli & Nelson) and Mondo Sessions 001 with Mike Koglin.

Tate has also recorded under the name Citizen Caned and now heads Mondo Records, a company which he started in 2000. Also included in the Mondo umbrella are Mondo Publishing (established in 2004) and Mondo DJs (formed in 2007). In January 2008, Tate revealed during an interview on his official website that he was doing some movie work.

In 2008, Tate completed a track for the film Royal Kill, which can be heard over the credits at the end of the film. He also released Horizons 02 as an EP.

In 2009, Tate was given a special mention and distinguished musician award by the IBLA Foundation for his classical work "Dark Skies" recorded with the Czech National Symphony Orchestra (CNSO) in Prague (October 2008).

In 2011, Tate announced several new projects, including Funkysober with Boy George and Marc Vedo, and Tate & Diamond with Harry Diamond.  The first Funkysober single "Sunshine into My Life" features vocals by Sharlene Hector and was released in the summer of 2011 on Very Good Records.  The first Tate & Diamond single "Turn It Back" was released in summer 2011 on Defected Records with the follow up "Electrified" released on Anjunabeats.  In addition, Tate announced the launch of a collaborative film scoring project entitled Brainstorm with composer Kenneth Lampl.  The first film they completed together was called Sid's Paralysis by director Babar Ahmed which went on to win a prize for musical excellence by the Park City Film Music Festival.

In 2012, Tate with Kenneth Lampl scored the motion picture The Undershepherd, directed by Russ Parr and starring Isaiah Washington, Keith David and Louis Gossett Jr. In addition, Tate & Lampl worked together on the feature film How Do You Write a Joe Schermann Song (director Gary King) which won best film and up and coming director at the Phoenix Film Festival and best picture at the Raindance Film Festival amongst other awards.  The team are currently scoring the motion picture Snapshot (dir. Eric Etebari), Awakened (dir. Arno Malarone, Joycelyn Engle) and Scavenger Killers (dir. Dylan Bank) which starred Charles Durning in his final role.

In 2013, it was announced that the duo would be scoring the feature film Frontera starring Ed Harris, Eva Longoria and Michael Pena (dir. Michael Berry).

In 2018, Tate co-produced and orchestrated the first album for The House and Garage Orchestra, Garage Classics. The album features performances by Kayla Amor, Sweet Female Attitude, Denzee, Kele Le Roc, Camden Cox, MC Neat, Shelley Nelson, Shy Cookie, Shola Ama, Oggie, Freejak, Safety First, BB Diamond, Tough Love and Reigns.

On Record Day 2021, Fat Possum Records released a limited edition album, Give Me More Love by Al Green which was co-produced by Tate. The album took the original recordings from Green which were originally released by Hi Records and incorporates new orchestral arrangements by Tate. It features updated versions of some of Green's greatest hits including "Let's Stay Together", "Here I Am (Come and Take Me)" and "Tired of Being Alone".

In 2022, Tate collaborated with Above & Beyond on The Last Glaciers (Original Motion Picture Soundtrack) and started another project with A&B's Jono Grant under the name JODA with the first single being "We Find Ourselves".

Discography

Charted singles (as producer)
 June 2000: "It's My Turn" - No. 11 UK (Angelic)
 October 2000: "Eternity" - No. 38 UK (Orion)
 February 2001: "Can't Keep Me Silent" - No. 12 UK (Angelic)
 April 2001: "The Journey" - No. 41 UK (Citizen Caned)
 November 2001: "Stay with Me" - No. 36 UK (Angelic)
 September 2002: "The Theme" - No. 13 UK (Jurgen Vries)
 February 2003: "The Opera Song" - No. 3 UK (Jurgen Vries feat. CMC)
 May 2003: "Destination" - No. 23 UK (DT8 feat. Roxanne Wilde)
 October 2003: "Wilderness" - No. 20 UK (Jurgen Vries feat. Shena)
 June 2004: "Take My Hand" - No. 23 UK (Jurgen Vries feat. Andrea Britton) - cover of Dido's track of the same name
 August 2004: "The Sun Is Shining (Down on Me)" - No. 17 UK (DT8 Project feat. Rob Li)
 March 2005: "Winter" - No. 35 UK (DT8 Project feat. Andrea Britton)
 August 2008:  "I Surrender" - No. 4 Flemish Ultratip chart, No. 21 Wallonia Ultratip chart, No. 12 Dutch chart (co-written with Victoria Horn and performed by Kate Ryan)

Other releases
 2002: "Let the Light Shine In" (Darren Tate & Jono Grant)
 2003: "See Me Here" (Orion with uncredited vocals by Rebecca Raines)
 2003: "Nocturnal Creatures" (Darren Tate & Jono Grant)
 2004: "Prayer for a God" (Darren Tate)
 2004: "The Other Love" (Darren Tate vs Blue Amazon) - remix of the original Blue Amazon track
 2005: "Venus" (Darren Tate)
 2006: Horizons 01 (Darren Tate) - Tate's first album
 2006: "Narama" (DT8 Project feat. Mory Kante)
 2007: "Hold Me Till the End" (DT8 Project feat. Alexta)
 2007: "Echoes / Chori Chori" (Darren Tate)
 2008: "Perfect World" (DT8 Project feat. Maria Willson) and Perfect World album
 2018: Leave It All Behind Vol. 1 EP (DT8 Project)
 2018: "Timeless" (Darren Tate)
 2018: Garage Classics (The House and Garage Orchestra) (as producer/arranger/orchestrator)
 2019: "Cycles" (DT8 Project)
 2019: Leave It All Behind Vol. 2 EP (DT8 Project)
 2019: Leave It All Behind Vol. 3 EP (DT8 Project)
 2019: "Carry On/We Are Oxygen" (DT8 Project)
 2020: Where We Go From Here Pt. 1 EP (DT8 Project)

Filmography

Film credits
The Last Glaciers (with Above and Beyond (band)) (2021)
Little Horror Movie (2019)
Among Us (2017)
Bwoy (2016)
 Definitely Divorcing (2015)
 Frontera (2014)
 Hear No Evil (2014)
 The Fright Night Files (TV film) (2014)
 Unnerved (2014)
 A Christmas Blessing (2014)
 Awakened (2014)
 Snapshot (2014)
 Scavenger Killers (2014)
 The Undershepherd (2013)
 How Do You Write a Joe Schermann Song (sound mixing) (2013)

Short films
Less Heat in Arizona (2018)
The Prison Web (2015)
 Enhanced (2015)
 The Boy Next Door (2014)
 Princess & Grace (2014)

Television
 Compromised (Pilot) (2014)

References

External links
 Official website 
 Darren Tate on the website of Mondo Records
 Darren Tate (DT8 Project) on the Mondo DJs website

Club DJs
English DJs
English dance musicians
English record producers
1972 births
Living people
English trance musicians
English film score composers
English male film score composers
Musicians from London
Electronic dance music DJs